Gibran Rakabuming Raka (born 1 October 1987) is an Indonesian politician and businessman who is currently serving as the Mayor of Surakarta. He is the eldest child of the seventh Indonesian president Joko Widodo.

Early life and education
Gibran was born in Surakarta, Central Java, on 1 October 1987, as the first child of Joko Widodo (Jokowi) and Iriana. Gibran completed his first nine years of education in Indonesia, before moving to Singapore where he studied at Orchid Park Secondary School. He obtained his bachelor degree from Management Development Institute of Singapore.

Career

Business career
In 2010, Gibran founded Chilli Pari, a catering business based in Surakarta. According to Gibran, he was inspired to set up the company after noticing the lack of a catering service for a conference centre owned by his father, but was opposed by Jokowi who intended for Gibran to continue his furniture business. The company grew and became focused on providing services for wedding parties.

Gibran then started Markobar, a martabak chain, in 2015, and the chain had 29 locations in Indonesia by 2017. Jokowi commented in 2017 that though he did not initially approve of Gibran's business, Gibran's company ended up being valued higher than his furniture company. Gibran's reported wealth, filed in 2020 as a prerequisite to run for office, was reported at Rp 22.1 billion.

Politics
In July 2019, Gibran was named a favourite candidate for the 2020 Surakarta mayoral election, his father's position before becoming Governor of Jakarta and later President of Indonesia, according to a survey by Slamet Riyadi University based there. In September, Gibran registered as a member of PDI-P, the same political party as Jokowi, in order to run in the mayoral election. The party officially endorsed Gibran as their mayoral candidate in July 2020, pairing him with city council speaker Teguh Prakosa. All parties represented in the city council endorsed Gibran with the exception of the Prosperous Justice Party, potentially creating an uncontested election. Ultimately, the candidacy of Bagyo Wahyono, a tailor by profession, was approved on 6 September 2020. Gibran's candidacy was also challenged by the activist Halim HD, who seeks votes for the blank box instead of the well-connected candidates. In the election itself, Gibran with a comfortable margin after winning 86.53 percent of votes (225,451 votes). Gibran and his running mate Teguh Prakosa had spent nearly 30 times more to campaign for the election compared to Bagyo.

Personal life
Gibran married Selvi Ananda on 11 June 2015, and the couple had their first child, Jan Ethes Srinarendra, on 10 March 2016.

References

1987 births
Indonesian Democratic Party of Struggle politicians
Children of national leaders
Javanese people
21st-century Indonesian businesspeople
Living people
Joko Widodo
People from Surakarta
Mayors of Surakarta